Harpreet Singh (born 25 February 1973) is an Indian field hockey player. He competed at the 1992 Summer Olympics and the 1996 Summer Olympics.

References

External links
 

1973 births
Living people
Indian male field hockey players
Olympic field hockey players of India
Field hockey players at the 1992 Summer Olympics
Field hockey players at the 1996 Summer Olympics
Place of birth missing (living people)
Asian Games silver medalists for India
Medalists at the 1994 Asian Games
Asian Games medalists in field hockey
Field hockey players at the 1994 Asian Games